Lucéram is a commune in the Alpes-Maritimes department in southeastern France. Lucéram is in the region Provence-Alpes-Côte d'Azur. Its inhabitants are called the Lucéramois.

Luceram village is home of Peïra-Cava, the first station of winter sports department created in 1909. The village has many ecclesiastical and medieval monuments and altarpieces of Ludovico Brea.

Population

Geography 
The town is built on a rocky outcrop overlooking the Foil. In the lower valley, there is an intersection of the salt road that leads from the port of Nice in Savoy, through the valley of Vésubie. The village lies at 650 meters altitude, and 27 kilometers from Nice by D 2566.

Toponymy 

The origin of the name "Lucéram" is uncertain.

Lucéram is originally the name Lucerius or Lucerus. Lucerius was a Benedictine monk.
The name is a derivative of a Luceranus that appears in text in 1057, and may have given the village its name.
The Latin phrase Lux eram ("I was light") could also be the origin of the name.
Durante gives another expression, Lucus eram ("I was a sacred grove"), which appears to refer to the ancient worship of the forest that surrounds the village. This etymology is questionable when it is compared with its Latin name Pagus Liccirum. Louis Durante also indicates that the village was built on a fully wooded eminence. In ancient texts there are also the names Lucis-ramus and Luciramus. Luceram was the capital of the tribe of Lepontii quoted on listing Trophée des Alpes.

Sights
Sights include the church St. Margaret (late 15th century), housing an altarpiece by Ludovico Brea and a 13th-century Pietà.

Culture
Each year, the mayor and villagers   decorate the village in the theme of Christmas. The village is covered with pine branches and red and gold ribbons. There are  nativity scenes set up on window sills, in cellars or any available nook and cranny.

See also
Communes of the Alpes-Maritimes department

References

Communes of Alpes-Maritimes
Monte Carlo Rally
Alpes-Maritimes communes articles needing translation from French Wikipedia